Kunar Valley is a valley in Afghanistan and Pakistan. In Afghanistan the length of the valley is almost entirely narrow with steep and rugged mountains on both sides.  The center of the valley is occupied by the Kunar River flowing south where it joins the Kabul River.  Subsistence farming and goat-herding are the extent of agriculture production on the valley floor and lower elevations.  There are limited and small forested areas in some side valleys but more than 95% of the valley has been deforested. In limited areas at higher elevations there are sustained grassy mountain meadows.  Overwhelmingly though the Kunar Valley is an arid, rocky, steep landscape with a fast-moving muddy river as its primary geographic feature.

See also
Kunar River
Kunar Province

References

Valleys of Afghanistan
Valleys of Khyber Pakhtunkhwa
Chitral District
Landforms of Nuristan Province
Landforms of Kunar Province
Landforms of Nangarhar Province